The men's road race at the 2000 UCI Road World Championships was the 67th edition of the event. The race took place on Sunday 15 October 2000 in Plouay, France. The race was won by Romāns Vainšteins of Latvia.

Final classification

References

Men's Road Race
UCI Road World Championships – Men's road race